Be The Boss is an American reality-competition television series on A&E. The series debuted on December 2, 2012 and follows two employees who work for franchise-owned companies as they work their way to the top in order to own their franchise and "be the boss".

The series was intended to be a spin-off of the hit series Undercover Boss on CBS until CBS dropped the series and it was moved to A&E.

Production
On August 17, 2010, it was announced that CBS had ordered an untitled Studio Lambert project for a pilot which featured "two employees who work at the same company competing against one another for a major promotion".  News about the series went silent until it was announced on February 14, 2012 that the series has been picked up by A&E.

On December 7, 2012, A&E announced that the series has been moved to a late night slot at 11:00/10:00c.

Episodes

References

External links
 Official Page

2012 American television series debuts
2013 American television series endings
English-language television shows
A&E (TV network) original programming